Anthony Sauthier (born 5 February 1991) is a Swiss professional footballer who plays as a midfielder for Yverdon.

Club career
On 12 January 2022, Sauthier joined Yverdon on loan until the end of the season. On 12 July 2022, he returned to Yverdon on a permanent basis with a two-year contract.

References

1991 births
Footballers from Geneva
Living people
Association football midfielders
Swiss men's footballers
Switzerland youth international footballers
FC Sion players
Servette FC players
Yverdon-Sport FC players
Swiss Challenge League players
Swiss 1. Liga (football) players
Swiss Super League players
2. Liga Interregional players
Swiss Promotion League players